The 2014 African Men's Handball Championship was the 21st edition of the African Men's Handball Championship, held in Algiers and Chéraga, Algeria, from 16 to 25 January 2014. It acted as the African qualifying tournament for the 2015 World Men's Handball Championship in Qatar.

In the final, hosts Algeria beat Tunisia 25–21 to win their seventh title after beating

Venues

Qualification

Qualified teams

1 Bold indicates champion for that year. Italics indicates host.

Referees
11 couples were announced for the competition.

Squads

Draw
The draw was held on 9 October 2013.

Preliminary round
All times are local (UTC+1).

Group A

Group B

Knockout stage

Bracket

5–8th place bracket

Quarterfinals

5–8th place semifinals

Semifinals

Eleventh place game

Ninth place game

Seventh place game

Fifth place game

Third place game

Final

Ranking and statistics

Final ranking

All Star Team
The All-star team and award winners were announced

Other awards

See also
2014 African Women's Handball Championship

References

External links
Results at todor66
African Handball Federation

2014 Men
African Men's Handball Championship
African Men's Handball Championship
African Men's Handball Championship
Men's Handball Championship